Mark L. Frigo is an American economist, currently the Ledger & Quill Alumni Foundation Distinguished Professor at Kellstadt Graduate School of Business, DePaul University.

References

Year of birth missing (living people)
Living people
DePaul University faculty
21st-century American economists
Place of birth missing (living people)